The National Service-Learning Conference was first held in 1988 to serve as "the largest gathering of youth and practitioners from the service-learning movement" of the United States. The conference is a program of the National Youth Leadership Council, and is co-hosted annually by partner organizations in the state or region where it is being held. Sponsors of the conference include United Parcel Service, Best Buy, Shinnyo-en Foundation, United Way of America, and E. Ronald and Patricia Parish.

The conference focuses on service-learning, an approach to teaching and learning in which students use academic knowledge and skills to address genuine community needs. Annually, the National Service-Learning Conference convenes teachers and other service-learning practitioners, administrators, researchers, policy-makers, youth leaders, parents, program coordinators, national service members, community-based organization staffs, and corporate and foundation officers. The conference is unique because typically youth comprise more than half its attendees and are treated as equal contributors. Youth present, exhibit, and attend the three-and-a-half-day event same as their adult counterparts.

Each year the conference features over 200 workshop sessions, thought-leader sessions, keynote addresses, an interactive exhibit hall with a service-learning showcase and college fair, both on- and off-site service-learning projects to allow participants an authentic learning opportunity, an administrator's academy, indigenous service-learning forum, preconference sessions for in-depth learning, as well as countless networking and professional development opportunities. Speakers from around the world present on international issues and help to ground the conference in a rapidly globalizing world. Artists, students, and community members from the host locale contribute to the ambiance of the conference each year. The hallways, exhibit hall aisles, and general spaces are transformed with spoken word, drumming, murals, paintings, etc. The conference takes on the culture of the city that hosts it, from the local food that is served to service projects that provide a deeper understanding of the host city.

For 2012, the conference was co-hosted with youthrive, the upper midwest affiliate of PeaceJam, and presented as The 23rd Annual National Service-Learning Conference & youthrive PeaceJam Leadership Conference. In addition to the full range of conference workshops and activities, the partnership with youthrive PeaceJam brought Nobel Laureate Shirin Ebadi as a featured speaker, and the week-long event ended with a celebration of Global Youth Service Day at the Mall of America.

The Service-Learning World Forum began in 2008 as a pre-conference session of the larger conference and is now an integral program of the larger conference. The World Forum engages attendees with international leaders, exploring youth service and service-learning as forces that span cultural and national boundaries, building communities and strengthening young people. World Forum attendees discover how service-learning is implemented from Ireland, to Argentina, to the Middle East, and is useful for both those working internationally and those interested in expanding their programs.

Each year since 2003 the conference has highlighted the National Service-Learning Awards. Awards are presented to leaders in the field of service-learning, both youths and adults. In 2006 the first William James National Service Lifetime Achievement Award was presented by the National Youth Leadership Council in conjunction with several leading service organizations. The award was given to former Senator Harris Wofford and presented by President Bill Clinton, Kathleen Kennedy Townsend, and Dr. James Kielsmeier. Since its inception, the conference has planted trees in each city that has hosted the event, in honor of the service-learning award winners.

The October 2009 issue of One+ magazine featured a four-page article highlighting the conference and its commitment to the community. One+ magazine is the official publication of Meeting Planners International. One+ is the leading voice of the meeting and event industry, reaching 30,000+ industry professionals on six continents.

List of conferences

Past speakers

See also
Service-learning
National Youth Leadership Council

External links
NYLC's National Service-Learning Conference page

Learning
Youth conferences
Academic conferences